is a feminine Japanese given name which is occasionally used as a surname.

Possible writings
Natsumi can be written using different kanji characters and can mean:
as a given name
夏美, "summer, beauty"
夏実, "summer, truth"
夏未, "summer, still"
夏海, "summer, sea"
夏生, "summer, life"
奈津美 "Nara, harbor, beauty"
奈津実 " Nara, harbor, truth"
as a surname
夏見, "summer, look"
The given name can also be written in hiragana or katakana.

Places
Natsumi (夏見), a place located in Funabashi, Chiba, Japan
Natsumi Temple complex (夏見廃寺), a Japanese archaeological site

People

Given name 
, Japanese singer and actress
, Japanese manga artist
, Japanese volleyball player
, Japanese tennis player
, Japanese football player
, Japanese voice actress
, Japanese tarento and actress
, Japanese swimmer
, Japanese manga artist
, Japanese idol
, Japanese tennis player
, Japanese voice actress
, Japanese actress and singer from Chiba
, Japanese musical actress and singer
, Japanese professional wrestler
, Japanese singer
, Japanese professional wrestler
, Japanese manga artist
, Japanese voice actress
, Japanese actress
, Japanese fashion model and actress
, Japanese swimmer
, Japanese artistic gymnast
, Japanese voice actress
, Japanese modern pentathlete
, Japanese judoka
Natsumi Tsuji (unknown, born 1993) Japanese girl known for murdering her classmate, Satomi Mitarai (Sasebo Slashing) 
, Japanese basketball player
, Japanese voice actress

Surname 
, Japanese cross country skier

Characters
Natsumi Hyuga, a character in the anime and manga series Alice Academy
Natsumi Asō (夏海), a character in the anime and manga series Sketchbook
, a character in the anime and manga series Sgt. Frog
, a character in the anime series Negima!
, a character in the You're Under Arrest franchise
Natsumi Shinohara/Yellow Racer, a character in Gekisou Sentai Carranger
Natsumi Mizuki, a character in anime and manga series GetBackers
Natsumi Hayama, a character from Kodocha
Natsumi Suouin, a male character in the yaoi manga Hoshi no Yakata.
Natsume Takashi, a character in the anime and manga series "Natsume Yūjin-chō"
, a character from the Japanese anime Inazuma Eleven.
Natsumi Kuzuryuu from the Japanese anime Danganronpa
Natsumi Hikari, a character in Kamen Rider Decade
Natsumi, a character in the Date A Live series

See also
, a trio within the Hello! Project

Japanese feminine given names
Japanese-language surnames